Joseph Allan Mack (born December 27, 2002) is an American professional baseball catcher for the Miami Marlins organization. He was selected by the Marlins in the first round of the 2021 Major League Baseball draft.

Amateur career
Mack lives in East Amherst, New York, and attended Williamsville East High School. As a sophomore, Mack batted .462 with four home runs and was named All-Western New York. His junior season was canceled due to COVID-19. Mack played in the 2020 Perfect Game All-American Classic. He entered his senior year as the top-ranked baseball player in the state of New York by MaxPreps and as one of the best catching prospects in the 2021 Major League Baseball draft. Mack signed a letter of intent to play college baseball at Clemson. As a senior, he led Williamsville East to the section A-1 championship.

Professional career
Mack was selected with the 31st overall pick in the 2021 Major League Baseball draft by the Miami Marlins. Mack signed with Miami for a bonus of $2.5 million.

Mack made his professional debut with the Rookie-level Florida Complex League Marlins, slashing .132/.373/.208 with one home run, twenty walks, and 22 strikeouts over 53 at-bats.

Personal life
Mack's older brother, Charles, played shortstop at Williamsville East and was selected in the sixth round of the 2018 Major League Baseball draft. His sister, Christy, plays college softball at the University of Hartford.

References

External links

Living people
Baseball players from New York (state)
Baseball catchers
2002 births
Florida Complex League Marlins players
Jupiter Hammerheads players